Xingtai railway station is a station on Beijing–Guangzhou railway in Xingtai, Hebei.

History
The station was opened in 1903 as Shunde Fu railway station .

References

Railway stations in Hebei
Stations on the Beijing–Guangzhou Railway
Railway stations in China opened in 1903